Frankie Scigliano (born January 16, 1992 in Coquitlam, British Columbia) is a professional lacrosse goaltender for the San Diego Seals in the National Lacrosse League.  He was a second round draft pick (18th overall) in the 2011 NLL Entry Draft.

Scigliano played junior for the New Westminster Jr. Salmonbellies.  The team went to the Minto Cup final in 2013, but lost to the Whitby Warriors. He was drafted 3rd overall in the Western Lacrosse Association 2014 draft by the Maple Ridge Burrards.  He went on to win the WLA rookie of the year and best goalie awards in 2014.

Internationally, Scigliano represented England at the 2019 World Indoor Lacrosse Championship. Heading into the 2023 NLL season, Inside Lacrosse named Scigliano the #7 best goalie in the NLL.

Awards
John Urban Award, New Westminster Jr A Salmonbellies Top Rookie: 2010
Ab Brown Award, New Westminster Jr A Salmonbellies Most Inspirational Player: 2011
Jack Fulton Award, New Westminster Jr A Salmonbellies MVP: 2013
WLA Ed Bayley Memorial Trophy (Rookie of the Year): 2014
WLA Leo Nicholson Award for Outstanding Goaltender: 2014
WLA All Star Team: 2014

References

1992 births
Living people
Calgary Roughnecks players
Canadian lacrosse players
Lacrosse goaltenders